Mohamed Abu al-Qasim al-Zwai (born 14 May 1952) is a Libyan politician who was the last Secretary General of Libya's General People's Congress and thus the country's nominal head of state from 2010 until 2011. He replaced Imbarek Shamekh. As of 8 September 2011 he is in custody of the NTC forces.

In May 2018, Zwai was among the high-profile Gaddafi loyalists who declared their support for Khalifa Haftar at a forum in Benghazi.

References

1952 births
Living people
Libyan Arab Socialist Union politicians
Heads of state of Libya
Secretaries-General of the General People's Congress
People of the First Libyan Civil War
Government ministers of Libya
Justice ministers of Libya
Ambassadors of Libya to Morocco
Ambassadors of Libya to the United Kingdom
Heads of government who were later imprisoned